Cultural schema theory is a cognitive theory that explains how people organize and process information about events and objects in their cultural environment.  According to the theory, individuals rely on schemas, or mental frameworks, to understand and make sense of the world around them. These schemas are shaped by culture, and they help people to quickly and efficiently process information that is consistent with their cultural background. Cultural schemas can include knowledge about social roles, customs, and beliefs, as well as expectations about how people will behave in certain situations. The theory posits that cultural schemas are formed through repeated interactions and experiences within a particular cultural group, and that they guide behavior in familiar social situations. Cultural schemas are distinct from other schemas in that they are shared among members of a particular cultural group, as opposed to being unique to individuals.

History 
Cultural schema theory may be a relatively new theory, but neither schema nor cultural schema are new concepts.

The idea of schemas existing as ideal types in the mind dates back all the way back to Plato (see also Schema and Schema (psychology)) . In the 19th century German philosopher Immanuel Kant developed the idea that every person's experiences are gathered in memory, forming higher order concepts. In the 1920s Jean Piaget's work investigated schemas in infants. In the 1930s Frederic Bartlett tested memory for schemas. From the 1970s to the 1990s, many researchers obtained loads of evidence showing that people's behaviors are deeply embedded to what they store in their brains. Through these studies researchers learned that human behavior relies heavily on past experiences and the knowledge stored in one's brain.

Research also revealed that schemas operate at many different levels. The experiences which are unique to individuals allow them to acquire personal schemas.  Societal schemas may emerge from a group's collective knowledge and are represented across the minds in a society, enabling people to think as if they are one mind (Malcolm & Sharifian, 2002). However, when one's cultural environment provides experiences to which every member of that culture is exposed, their experiences allow every member to acquire cultural schemas (Nishida, 1999). Cultural schemas are conceptual structures which enable individuals to store perceptual and conceptual information about their culture and interpret cultural experiences and expressions. If people are not equipped with the appropriate cultural schema, they may not be able to make sense of culturally unfamiliar situations (Malcolm & Sharifian, 2002).

How cultural schemas develop 

When one interacts with members of the same culture over and over again, or talks about certain information with them many times, cultural schemas are created and stored in one's brain. Subsequent similar instances cause the cultural schema to become more organized, abstract, and compact. As this occurs, communication becomes much easier. Nishida (1999) simply explains that experience is the force which creates cultural schemas. As people have more experiences their developing cultural schemas become more tightly organized. The information not only becomes more complex, but more useful among members of a culture, alike or different. Beyond the cognitive activity of cultural schemas is the complex pattern which occurs in the brain.

When humans acquire and retain information from their surrounding environments, neural circuits are generated. Consequently, information processing experience is stored in the long-term memory. Memory representation or neural circuits created in the brain as a result of information processing are assumed to be schemas . Thus, schemas provide a foundation in the brain which helps to predict what is to be expected and looked for in certain situations.

Not all schemas are uniformly important. High-level schemas are internalized and emotionally salient; likewise, when a schema is only weakly related to a person's self it becomes emotionally empty and irrelevant (Lipset, 1993).

Types of cultural schemas for social interactions 

Cultural schemas for social interactions are cognitive structures that contain knowledge for face-to-face interactions in one's cultural environment. Nishida (1999) points out the eight primary types for generating human behavior for social interactions. These eight schemas are also referred to as Primary Social Interaction (PSI) schemas.

 Fact-and-concept schemas: These are pieces of general information about facts, such as Washington, D.C. is the capital of the United States, and concepts, such as bicycles are vehicles that have two wheels, a seat, and pedals.
 Person schemas: These are knowledge about different types of people, specifically personality traits; for example, Barb is shy or Dave is outgoing. Since people have some representation or idea of what being shy or outgoing is, they tend to classify others, such as Barb and Dave, into their dominant personality traits.
 Self schemas: These contain people's knowledge of how they see themselves and knowledge of how others see them.
 Role schemas: These are knowledge about social roles that denote expected sets of behaviors of people in particular social positions.
 Context schemas: These contain information about the situations and appropriate settings of behavioral parameters. Information in context schemas includes predictions about appropriate actions to take in order to achieve goals in the respective context. Information also includes suggestions for reasonable problem-solving strategies. It is important to note that context schemas are triggered before other schemas .
 Procedure schemas: These are knowledge about the appropriate sequence of events in common situations. This includes the specific steps to take and the appropriate behavioral rules for the events. The use of procedure schemas causes people to take certain actions some way.
 Strategy schemas: These are knowledge about problem-solving strategies.
 Emotion schemas: These contain information about affect and evaluation stored in long-term memory. This is accessed when other schemas are activated. Emotion schemas develop through social interactions throughout a person's life. This schema is relatively new . Researchers believed it was an important additive because emotions play important roles in human social interactions.

Application to cross-cultural adaptation 
The term cross-cultural adaptation refers to the complex process through which an individual acquires an increasing level of the communication skills of the host culture and of relational development with host nationals. Simply put, cross-cultural adaptation is the transformation of a person's own PSI schemas into those of the host culture and acquisition of new PSI schemas in the host culture s/he is residing in. A number of different people may be subject to cross-cultural adaptation, including immigrants, refugees, business people, diplomats, foreign workers, and students. However, this entry specifically applies cultural schema theory to sojourners' cross cultural adaptation. Sojourners generally spend a few years in another culture while intending to return to their home country. Business people, diplomats, students, and foreign workers can all be classified as sojourners. In order to better explain sojourners' cross-cultural adaptation, axioms are used to express causal, correlational, or teleological relationships. Axioms also help to explain the basic assumptions of the cultural schema theory (Nishida, 1999).

Sojourners' axioms 
Nishida (1999) describes the following nine axioms:

Axiom 1: The more often a person repeats a schema-based behavior in his or her culture, the more likely the cultural schema will be stored in the person's memory.

Axiom 2: Sojourners' failure to recognize the actions and behaviors that are relevant to meaningful interactions in the host culture are mainly due to their lack of the PSI schemas of the culture.

Axiom 3: The acquisition of the PSI schemas of the host culture is a necessary condition for sojourners' cross-cultural adaptation to the culture.

Axiom 4: The PSI schemas of a person's own culture are interrelated with each other, forming a network of cultural schemas to generate behaviors that are appropriate in the culture. Experience in the host culture causes a change in one's cultural schema. This causes further changes in all other cultural schemas and results in a total change in behavior.

Axiom 5: The acquisition of information about interrelationships among the PSI schemas of the host culture is a necessary condition for sojourners' cross-cultural adaptation.

Axiom 6: People use both schema-driven and data-driven processing to perceive new information, depending on the situation and their motivations.

Axiom 7: If one has well-organized cultural schemas, schematically salient information is more likely to be processed through the schemas, whereas ambiguous information will either direct a search for the relevant data to complete the stimulus more fully, or it will be filled in with default options of the schemas.

Axiom 8: Sojourners who lack the PSI schemas of the host culture are more likely to employ data-driven processing, which requires effort and attention.

Axiom 9: In the host culture, sojourners encounter truly novel situations where they experience cognitive uncertainty and anxiety because of the lack of the PSI schemas in the situations.

Axiom 10: In the host culture, sojourners experience the stages of self-regulation and self-direction. In the stage of self-regulation, they try to resolve ambiguities and to establish integration of information using their native-culture schemas by gradually modifying them. In the stage of self-direction, on the other hand, they actively try to reorganize their native culture schemas or to generate host culture schemas in order to adapt to the host-culture environment.

Real-world example – a sojourner's experience 
As discussed above, sojourners are people who live in a culture other than their own with the intent of one day returning home. For sojourner Gillian Gibbons' situation, the cultural schema theory is highly applicable. Ms. Gibbons, a British school teacher, left Liverpool, England in August 2007 to teach a group of six- and seven-year-olds at Unity School in Khartoum, Sudan. Shortly after her arrival, Ms. Gibbons class was due to study the habitat and behavior of bears. Upon her request, a student brought in a teddy bear to serve as a case study. Students were invited to vote on a name for the bear. After considering the names Abdullah and Hassan, 20 of the 23 children voted in favor of the name Muhammad. What seemed like a harmless children's learning tool took a turn for the worse on November 25, 2007, when Ms. Gibbons was arrested at her home inside the school premises; Sudanese police claimed a number of parents complained to Sudan's Ministry of Education about the bear. Charges against Ms. Gibbons were prepared under article 125 of Sudanese criminal law which covers insults against faith and religions.  Ms Gibbons' particular crime: insulting Islam's Prophet Muhammad. In Islam, insulting the Prophet Muhammad is considered a grave offense.  Ms. Gibbons' was held in a Khartoum jail facing a maximum penalty of 40 lashes and 6 months in jail. Ms. Gibbons was found guilty of insulting Islam and sentenced to 15 days in jail and deportation from Sudan after her release. Sudanese President Omar al-Bashir granted her a pardon after she served nine days in jail due to pressure from the British government. She immediately returned to England upon her release. While colleagues, friends, and family regarded the whole situation as a misunderstanding, many local Sudanese disagreed. Hundreds of protestors gathered outside of the presidential palace to denounce Ms. Gibbons. Some protestors waved ceremonial swords, some voiced anger at the Sudanese government for not treating her more severely, some distributed leaflets which condemned her as an infidel and accused her of polluting children's mentality by her actions. At the edge of extreme were those who called for her execution (BBC News, 2007; CNN, 2007; The New York Times, 2007; Time, 2007; The Times, 2007). This highly publicized incident can be explained quite well by the cultural schema theory, particularly by discussing Ms. Gibbons' status as a sojourner in an unfamiliar culture. Axiom number three and axiom number nine apply quite well to Ms. Gibbons. As a sojourner, the acquisition of host culture PSI schemas would be necessary in order for the sojourner's cross-cultural adaptation to occur. Ms. Gibbons may have lived in Sudan, but she lived inside the walls of Unity School. According to BBC News (2007), once inside the walls of Unity School one would think s/he was at standing on the grounds of an Oxbridge University. This private school with children of well-to-do parents is much different than the rest of Sudan. Ms. Gibbons did not need to acquire the PSI schemas of the host culture because her native PSI schemas worked equally well inside the walls of Unity School. Had Ms. Gibbons been constantly made aware of the local PSI schemas (naming an animal after the Prophet Muhammad is unacceptable) she may have adapted and not allowed the children to name the teddy bear Muhammad. Naming a teddy bear was not a novel situation to her as a children's school teacher, but she was not in England. After the bear's naming she certainly encountered a novel situation where she experienced cognitive uncertainty and anxiety because of her lack of the PSI schemas in the situation. Hence the difficulties of cross-cultural adaptation for sojourners like Ms. Gibbons. They do not intend to stay and thus will not adapt/experience the stages of axioms which will best prepare them to appropriately fit in.

Contrasting theory 
Cultural schema theory is often compared and contrasted with the cultural consensus theory. Both theories present distinct perspectives about the nature of individual and cultural knowledge. However, unlike the cultural schema theory, the cultural consensus theory helps to describe and mathematically measure the extent to which cultural beliefs are shared. The central idea is the use of the pattern of agreement or consensus among members of the same culture.  Essentially, the more knowledge people have, the more consensus is observed among them. Unfortunately, the cultural consensus theory does not help others to better understand intracultural variability or how cultural knowledge is interrelated at a cognitive level. Cultural consensus theory anticipates intracultural variation but views variation as analogous to performance on a cultural test, with certain individuals functioning as better guides than others to the cultural information pool (Garro, 2000).

Further use and development of the theory 
Simply put, cultural schema theory can be described as cultural-specific world knowledge (Razi, 2002). As mentioned above, the concept of cultural schemas is not new, but the theory is.  Future studies must generate theorems and further tests must be conducted in order to better formulate theory itself and the axioms it proposes. Once this is complete the theory can be used in cross-cultural training purposes in order to facilitate individuals' adaptation to their respective host-culture environments (Nishida, 1999). There has been efforts to make this task done. For example, Ehsan Shahghasemi and D. Ray Heisey (2009) introduce the notion of "cross cultural schemata" as "abstract mental structures that one makes according to his/her past experiences or shared knowledge about the members of other cultures and thus makes them more understandable."

See also 
Culture shock
Framing (social sciences)
Intercultural communication
Intercultural competence

Notes

References 
 BBC News (2007). 'Muhammad' teddy teacher arrested. BBCNews.com. November 27, 2007. accessed March 25, 2008.
 CNN (2007). Sudan protestors: Execute teacher. CNN.com. November 30, 2007. accessed March 29, 2008.
 CNN (2007). Teddy row teacher leaves Sudan. CNN.com. December 3, 2007. accessed 28 March 2008.
 Crilly, Rob (2007). The blasphemous teddy bear.  TIME.  November 26, 2007. accessed March 25, 2008.
 Garro, L.C. (2000). Remembering what one knows and the construction of the past: A comparison of Cultural Consensus Theory and Cultural Schema Theory. Ethos, 28.3, 275-319.
 Gettleman, Jeffrey (2007). Sudan accuses teacher of Islam insult. New York Times. November 27, 2007. accessed March 25, 2008.
 Lipset, D. (1993). Review: Culture as a hierarchy of schemas. Current Anthropology, 34.4, 497-498.
 Malcolm, I.G. & Sharafian, F. (2002). Aspects of Aboriginal English oral discourse: an application of cultural schema theory. Discourse Studies, 4, 169-181.
 Nishida, H. (1999). Cultural Schema Theory: In W.B. Gudykunst (Ed.), Theorizing About Intercultural Communication, (pp. 401–418). Thousand Oaks, CA: Sage Publications, Inc.
 Razi, S. The Effects of Cultural Schema and Reading Activities on Reading Comprehension. Canakkale Onsekiz Mart University, Turkey. 1-18.
 Shaghasemi, E. & Heisey D. R. (2009). The cross-cultural schemata of Iranian-American people toward each other: A qualitative approach. Intercultural Communication Studies, XVIII(1), 143-160.
 Sharifian, F. (2008). Cultural schemas in L1 and L2 compliment responses: A study of Persian-speaking learners of English. Journal of Politeness Research. 4(1), 55-80.
 Sharifian, F. (2011). Cultural Conceptualisations and Language: Theoretical Framework and Applications. Amsterdam/Philadelphia: John Benjamins.
 Times Online (2007). British teacher sentenced to 15 days in Sudan jail. TimesOnline.com. November 29, 2007. accessed March 29, 2008.

Cultural studies
Communication theory
Philosophical theories
Psychological theories